Neal Woodside Allen (1885–1976) was an American politician and businessperson from Portland, Maine. He served as chairman of the Portland City Council twice (1925–26). He was elected to the first city council chosen in December 1923 after the Chamber of Commerce and Ku Klux Klan collaborated to install a council–manager government. In 1912, he purchased F. O. Bailey company, an auctioneering company which he held until his death. In 1942, he was one of the founding appointees to the Portland Planning Board and regularly served as its chair.

Allen was born in Portland and graduated from Phillips Exeter Academy in 1904 Bowdoin College in 1907. He married Margaret Stevens, who was the daughter of architect John Calvin Stevens. The pair had four sons: Charles, Frederick, Neil, Jr., and Franklin, and two daughters, Louise and Barbara. One of his children, Frederick, served in the Maine Legislature from 1944 to 1952. His grandson is former U.S. Congressman Tom Allen.

References

1885 births
1976 deaths
Mayors of Portland, Maine
Maine Republicans
Businesspeople from Portland, Maine
Phillips Exeter Academy alumni
Bowdoin College alumni